Annie Avril Nightingale  (born 1 April 1940) is an English radio and television broadcaster. She was the first female presenter on BBC Radio 1 in 1970, and is its longest-serving presenter.

Early life and career
Nightingale was born in Osterley, Middlesex on 1 April 1940, the daughter of Celia and Basil Nightingale. After attending St Catherine's School, Twickenham, Lady Eleanor Holles School, Hampton, Middlesex (by scholarship), and the Polytechnic of Central London (now the University of Westminster) School of Journalism, Nightingale began her career as a journalist in Brighton, East Sussex.

During the early to mid-sixties Nightingale explored opportunities working in television, both as a reporter for BBC's Southampton /Bristol based news programme South Today and light entertainment and music programmes for the ITV Network Southern TV (now ITV Meridian.)

Nightingale had joined the weekly Brighton and Hove Gazette as a general reporter. A year later she was promoted to the Brighton Evening Argus, as a general reporter, feature writer, and diarist. The latter involved interviews with Sean Connery in his first James Bond role and Peter Sellars on location. She became the newspaper’s first pop music columnist.

As a result of meeting Dusty Springfield and her manager Vicki Wickham, editor of the new ground-breaking pop TV show Ready Steady Go, Nightingale was invited to host a new sister TV show. Nightingale joined Associated-Rediffusion TV and hosted her own show That's For Me. Nightingale presented the pop culture show, booked guest musicians who had not previously been seen on TV such as The Yardbirds and introduced The Who’s first promotion film. At this time, she also hosted other specials for Associated-Rediffusion, including The Glad Rag Ball at Wembley, starring the Rolling Stones, and the British Song Festival in Brighton. She also covered the San Remo Song Festival, Italy. Nightingale made numerous appearances on Ready Steady Go and was a guest on their uproarious New Year's Eve Specials, which included the biggest pop, soul and rock stars of the era.

The following year, Nightingale co-hosted the music series Sing A Song Of Sixpence, with star actor and host Ronan O'Casey. Later she appeared in the BBC TV series A Whole Scene Going and made appearances on Juke Box Jury with such artists as Marianne Faithfull.

In the mid-sixties, inspired by her friend Pauline Boty, the distinguished pop art painter, she launched a chain of fashion boutiques, as a ‘front’ person and publicist.  This swiftly became a chain called Snob. Nightingale put on fashion shows and took part in them, notably a charity show for the Duke Of Norfolk at Arundel Castle, West Sussex. She also became a well-known fashion model at the time, with sessions with such photographers as Philip Townsend and Dezo Hoffman.

At this time Nightingale wrote regular columns and was both featured in and a feature writer for leading youth magazines such as Town, Fabulous, Honey 19, and Petticoat. She specialised in writing about teen issues, burgeoning feminist perspectives and social issues. Nightingale also wrote for the music magazine Disc and Music Echo. 

Nightingale was the pop music columnist and feature writer for Cosmopolitan when it launched in the UK. Later and until the mid-eighties, she wrote regularly for the Sunday Mirror and wrote music columns for The Daily Sketch and The Daily Express. 

It was the huge impact of pop pirate ships, broadcasting illegally into Great Britain from international waters, that inspired Nightingale (who was by this time steeped in pop culture) to want to become a disc jockey. The pirate ships were outlawed by the UK government and shut down. Prime Minister Harold Wilson decreed that the BBC would run a new pop music station on land from London to replace them. This became Radio 1 and was launched in September 1967. It was decreed by the production teams launching Radio 1 (many of whom were male ex RAF staff), that there would be no women on air. Nightingale applied for a job as a Radio 1 DJ but was firmly rejected on the grounds of being a woman.

Radio 1 decreed that its all-male DJ team were ‘husband substitutes' and that a woman among them would alienate what they perceived to be a mostly female audience. Nightingale persisted for three years and was only given a chance to audition by her friends the Beatles and their staff at Apple Records. 

Nightingale was given a trial run of six programmes before she was signed as the first female DJ on Radio 1. Her first shows (after a trial run on Sunday nights), were daytime afternoon slots, handed over from Terry Wogan who made Nightingale laugh so much she had to control her mirth to deliver her first link smoothly.

Nightingale remained the only female DJ at Radio 1 for 12 years, from 1970 until 1982 when she was joined by Janice Long.  By then Nightingale was granted her request to broadcast her show in the evenings, which gave her more scope to play emerging underground and experimental music. 

Early in the 1970s Nightingale hosted a documentary film series for BBC 1 TV entitled Before The Event. The series was filmed all over the UK in locations such as The Lake District and Derbyshire. The series recorded the build-up to major events in the British sporting calendar such as The Hennessy Gold Cup steeplechase and the Formula 1 British Grand Prix motor race at Silverstone UK

A little later she appeared in her first feature film Home Before Midnight, starring James Aubrey and Chris Jagger, brother of Mick. Nightingale played a talk show TV host and was billed as playing the part of herself. 

Later, Nightingale moved to a Sunday afternoon slot on Radio 1, hosting a request show from 1975 till 1979. This proved to be such a success that it was brought back in 1982 and continued to run for a further 12 years.  

In the interim (1979-1982) Nightingale hosted a breakthrough Radio 1 Friday night music chat show, featuring live studio guests such as Clive James, Rowan Atkinson, Michael Palin, Sting, Duran Duran and The Who. Then came a schedule change, reviving the Request show, which was broadcast at 7 pm on Sundays, immediately following the mammoth Top 40 show. 

This request show became a cult listen. Nightingale believed she had found her audience with this show slot, which lasted from 1982-94. Nightingale credited Bernie Andrews, the producer for the team for his success with this show, and later Pete Ritzema. When Nightingale was away, guest star ‘deps’ such as Annie Lennox and Paula Yates were brought in to present and feature on the show. 
 
Andrews was a visionary, assisting the Beatles to gain greater exposure on BBC Radio before Radio 1 was launched. He was also hugely influential in producing live sessions for the greatest names of the era, including Jimi Hendrix and Pink Floyd. Andrews notably launched the career of John Peel on Radio 1.

During this period, Nightingale presented another Radio 1 show, a current affairs Wednesday evening show called Mailbag. Mailbag concentrated on issues for young people, and politics. Nightingale's live studio guests included the government minister for Nuclear Procurement, and the budding comedians Dawn French and Jennifer Saunders. At one stage, Mailbag was produced by Juliet Blake, who went on to have a distinguished career in British comedy television before becoming a Hollywood feature film producer. 

Nightingale also hosted a live Friday night slot, produced by another top Radio 1 producer, Jeff Griffin. 

In 1981 Nightingale published her first memoir, the vividly illustrated art book, Chase the Fade. The book was illustrated with images from Nightingale’s photo archive, as well as images from her collection of pop memorabilia. The text featured descriptions of The 1970  Isle Of Wight Festival, The Who, and her experience touring with the BBC TV documentary, Police In The East. 

Between 1989 -1990 Nightingale hosted an interview TV series for ITV entitled One To One. She conducted in-depth interviews with Debbie Harry, Paul McCartney, Stevie Nicks, Peter Gabriel, John Taylor of Duran Duran, and Status Quo. 

Between 1989-91, in addition to continuing her Radio 1 show, Nightingale hosted a Sunday lunchtime show featuring live phone-ins for Greater London Radio. This show included live guests such as Ronnie Wood of the Rolling Stones, comedian Jack Dee and actor Dirk Bogarde. She also took on the GLR mid-morning daily show. 

Nightingale worked with BBC TV on the Old Grey Whistle Test for eleven years. She worked further with the BBC team, presenting long-running shows such as Late Night In Concert in addition to her weekly Old Grey Whistle Test slot and Christmas specials. During her tenure on the show, Nightingale introduced and championed artists such as The Ramones, The Adverts, Talking Heads, Siouxsie and the Banshees, Ian Dury And The Blockheads, Public Image Ltd, Gang Of Four, Linton Kwesi Johnson, The Au Pairs, Patti Smith, Iggy Pop, Blondie, Robert Fripp, John Cooper Clarke,  U2, The Clash, Wreckless Eric,  Elvis Costello and The Attractions, Poly Styrene and  X-Ray Spex. The Rolling Stones, Spandau Ballet, Duran Duran, Adam and The Ants, The Who, The Teardrop Explodes,  The Damned,  Madness, The Specials, Pauline Black and The Selecter. Nightingale interviewed artists for the show, including Mick Jagger, Mick Taylor, Jeff Beck, Frank Zappa, Dusty Springfield and Paul Simon.

For Live Aid 1985 Nightingale was commissioned by the Live Aid team to be the BBC’s sole presenter at the Philadelphia US special. She commentated and presented, introducing artists such as Duran Duran, Madonna, the Pretenders, Eric Clapton, Led Zeppelin, Crosby Stills and Nash.

Nightingale became very involved with the burgeoning acid house music revolution from 1989 onwards, playing much of the coming nineties decade music on her Radio 1 show before it went mainstream. This new era of electronic and dance music involved the production and release of many extended tracks and 12-inch singles that broke away from the traditional three-minute pop song.  It suited this style of music to be played later in the evening, and so Nightingale went on to present a later slot on Radio 1 on Sunday nights, and then as rave culture took over, late-night party slots on Friday and Saturday nights.

She began her career as a journalist, broadcaster, columnist, TV host and fashion boutique owner, embracing the revolutionary years of her youth in the 1960s amid the Beatles, Rolling Stones, The Who, The Kinks, David Bowie, The Byrds,  The Beach Boys and other leading pop artists and writers.

In the 1960s and 1970s, she wrote columns for the Daily Express, the Daily Sketch, Petticoat and Cosmopolitan magazine.

She joined BBC Radio 1 in 1970, becoming the first national female DJ on the BBC and has remained a broadcaster there ever since. Nightingale has specialised in championing new and underground music, she has also led the movement and encouraged other women to become DJs and broadcasters. She is BBC Radio 1’s longest serving broadcaster and holds the Guinness World Record for the longest career as a female radio presenter.

Radio career

Presenter and writer
Her first broadcast on the BBC was on 14 September 1963 as a panellist on Juke Box Jury, and she contributed to Woman's Hour in 1964 and hosted programmes on the BBC Light Programme in 1966.

She started at BBC Radio 1 on 8 February 1970 with a Sunday evening show. The show was short-lived and in April she became one of the hosts of the singles review show What's New before graduating to a late-night progressive rock show, Sounds of the 70s, with Alan Black, John Peel, Bob Harris, Pete Drummond, and Mike Harding which was simulcast on the BBC Radio 2's FM frequency.

In the mid-to late 1970s, she presented a Sunday-afternoon request show, and in the early 1980s she presented a Friday night show and the non-music-based Radio 1 Mailbag and Talkabout.

In 1978, Nightingale became the main presenter of The Old Grey Whistle Test on BBC2 as a replacement for long-time host Bob Harris. During her tenure, the show moved away from its traditional bias under Harris towards country music, blues rock and progressive rock and embraced popular modern styles such as punk rock and new wave. She left the series in 1982.

She had begun The Sunday Request Show in September 1975, originally on Sunday afternoons until the end of 1979. It began its second and most famous run in December 1982, for most of its run in a slot immediately after the Top 40. The show was one of the first on British radio to regularly play music from CDs, taking advantage of its FM carriage before BBC Radio 1 had its own higher-quality frequencies. A gimmick was to allow the intro of the first song in the show to play uninterrupted before saying "Hi" in the last second before the vocals started.

In 1994, Nightingale moved to a weekend overnight dance music show initially called The Chill Out Zone. She can still be heard in the early hours of Friday mornings, Wednesday mornings, and later Tuesday late-nights on BBC Radio 1. From the mid 2000s she hosted a breaks show, often featuring major breaks DJs such as Plump DJs, Freestylers, Noisia and Meat Katie. Until embracing the Trap scene and certainly had her hand in popularising the genre. Nightingale regularly DJs live at clubs and festivals around the UK and Europe.

As a DJ, Nightingale has travelled and performed all over the world from Ibiza to Paris, New York, Los Angeles, Austin, Barcelona, Warsaw and at major European festivals such as Sziget in Budapest, Roskilde in Denmark as well as at all the major British festivals such as Glastonbury, Bestival, Wickerman, Rockness, Lovebox, Kendal Calling and numerous others. She has also broadcast TV and Radio documentaries during visits to Russia, Romania, Iraq, Chile, Philippines, United States, France, Ibiza, Japan, China, India and Cuba. At the same time she has become a regular contributor to BBC Four news programmes such as The Today Programme, The World At One and The World This Weekend. While in Havana in 1996, she was injured during a mugging, resulting in multiple injuries requiring an air-lift to a London hospital, since which she has worn the distinctive shades, now part of her image.

In 2002, Nightingale was appointed as a Member of the Order of the British Empire for her services to radio broadcasting. The award recognised her in-depth coverage of the radio scene. In 2004, she was the first female DJ from Radio 1 to be inducted into the Radio Academy Hall of Fame.

Nightingale has published two autobiographical books: Chase The Fade (1981)  and Wicked Speed (1999) . She has compiled three albums: Annie on One (1996, Heavenly Recordings), in which she included the then unsigned and undiscovered Daft Punk, her own instalment of the Breaks DJ mix series Y4K (2007, Distinctive Records), and 'Masterpiece' on the Ministry of Sound compilation series of that name (July 2015)

On 30 September 2007, the 40th anniversary of BBC Radio 1 was celebrated, Nightingale co-hosted a special return of the Request Show with Annie Mac featuring contributions from musicians such as Paul McCartney and Chemical Ed, excerpts from the original show and Nightingale's recollections of regular contributors such as "Night Owl of Croydon". The show featured many classic tracks which had been requested over the years and closed with one of Nightingale's favourites, Cristina's version of "Is That All There Is?".

A version of The Smiths song "Panic" interpreted by Mancunian cult comedian Frank Sidebottom dedicates its choruses to "Anne the DJ" (in place of the original song's "Hang the DJ") and asks "Anne Nightingale what's your blinking game; I waited for your roadshow, but your roadshow never came". In 2014, she appeared in The Life of Rock with Brian Pern as herself.

On 20 May 2011, she was featured in the BBC Four documentary Annie Nightingale: Bird on the Wireless, documenting her life and passion for music. The film has been shown a total of 3 times on BBC Four and it features tributes from Paul Weller and Tinie Tempah and interviews with Paul McCartney, Mani from The Stone Roses and Primal Scream, DJ Starscream and The Clash’s Mick Jones.

In 2011 Nightingale won the Best Special Radio Award for the sixth year running at the International Breakbeat Awards, and the BBC A&M award for the mammoth A Night With Annie Nightingale on BBC Radio 1.

Nightingale was made an honorary Doctor of Letters at the University of Westminster in December 2012. She is an ambassador at Prince Charles' The Prince's Trust and a patron of Sound Women, an organisation to promote women in broadcasting.

In 2011, the BBC launched its new BBC Archive Centre and named one of its vaults after Annie Nightingale, where she is in the company of Michael Palin and Sir David Frost.

In 2013, Nightingale was featured in the BBC Radio 4 programme Getting on Air: the Female Pioneers, presented by Jane Garvey.

In 2015, it was revealed that Nightingale had been approached by the BBC to sign a letter warning Prime Minister David Cameron that his plans to reform the corporation would damage it. Nightingale, one of the letter's 29 signatories, revealed later on that she had not read the letter prior to signing it.

In 2015, she was commissioned by Paul McCartney to write the accompanying fully illustrated book as part of the deluxe re-release of his classic albums Tug of War and Pipes of Peace. In the same year, she appeared at ITV's gala spectacular The Nation's Favourite Beatles Number One.

In July 2020, Annie appeared as a guest on the long-running BBC Radio 4 show Desert Island Discs, choosing a saxophone as her luxury item and "Space Oddity" as the one track she would save in the event of a tropical storm.

Already Member of the Order of the British Empire (MBE), Nightingale was also appointed Commander of the Order of the British Empire (CBE) in the 2020 New Year Honours for services to radio broadcasting. She is the only BBC Radio 1 broadcaster ever to receive this honour.

More recently, Nightingale has written for the Guardian, The Times, Daily Telegraph, and The Spectator. In 2020 Nightingale was nominated for an Aria Award. She was awarded a lifetime achievement award by the Audio Production Awards. 

Nightingale's memoir, entitled Hey Hi Hello, celebrates five decades of pop culture and Nightingale’s 50th anniversary as the first female DJ/presenter on Radio was published by White Rabbit in 2020. Hey Hi Hello became an Amazon bestseller, was named a Rough Trade Book Of The Year in 2020 and was nominated for the Penderyn Music book prize.

Hey Hi Hello received glowing reviews, including praise from Trainspotting’s author Irvine Welsh.  The Guardian described the memoir as ‘a joy to read’. The book's publication was celebrated with a BBC Radio 2's Christmas Special hosted by Zoe Ball.

The hardback published in September 2020 was soon followed by the paperback publication in 2021, which received another round of accolades from the media. Nightingale recorded an audiobook version to coincide with the hardback publication. 

In 2020 Nightingale recorded Desert Island Discs, for BBC Radio 4 with Lauren Laverne. This was extremely well received, including by Jennifer Saunders. Nightingale's luxury item was a saxophone, and most treasured disc, David Bowie’s Space Oddity. This was partly due to her early belief (after hearing this record in 1969) that Bowie was the future of pop culture, especially so after the Beatles broke up. Nightingale told Bowie this after a memorable encounter when she invited the artist for a solo drink and interview session at The Colonnade Bar, Brighton.  

The publication of Hey Hi Hello coincided with the celebrations of her 50th anniversary, including an Annie Nightingale Night on BBC 4. This consisted of two back-to-back documentaries focussing on the punk and new wave eras that Nightingale championed during her five-year residency as anchor of The Old Grey Whistle Test. Nightingale was the first woman to host a rock music tv show singlehandedly. Following the documentary was a showing of the BBC TV film Bird On The Wireless, directed by Simon Brook, acclaimed film director and son of theatre director Peter Brook and international movie star Natasha Parry. This was followed by a screening of Police In The East, the groundbreaking TV documentary directed by Derek Burbidge. This featured Nightingale narrating, commentating on and interviewing the new wave rock/pop group The Police as they were emerging as the best selling group in the world.  This film was shot in Japan, Hong Kong, India, Egypt and Greece, and gave Nightingale a lifelong desire for long-distance travel and documentary making exploration adventures. 

In 2021, Nightingale's regular weekly Radio 1 show, now in its 52nd year was moved to an earlier slot, 11 pm on Tuesdays. In November 2021, Nightingale launched the Radio 1 scholarships.  Nightingale discovered female and non-binary DJs, three who were given a special one-off slot on a Saturday night. The DJs were Martha from London, LCY from Bristol UK, and Godlands from Australia.

In 2022 Nightingale was included in 100 Voices that represented significant BBC figures to celebrate the Corporation’s centenary.  An extended video interview conducted and produced by the University of Sussex  History department has now been lodged within its archive

BBC Radio 2
In April 2012, Nightingale presented a show on BBC Radio 2 called Annie Nightingale's Eternal Jukebox. She has continued presenting this on an occasional basis, usually on bank holidays. The Eternal Jukebox showcases "enjoyably unexpected musical pairings." Listeners are invited to suggest a song and Annie pairs it up with another song often of a different genre and suggests a link between the two songs. On 25 June 2012, she also presented a documentary for BBC Radio 2 called Is It Worth It?, about the Falklands War in 1982. It was described on the Radio 2 website as "30 years on from the Falklands conflict, Annie Nightingale considers the impact of the war through the song Shipbuilding."

Nightingale returned to Radio 2 on 1 January 2014 for another one-off show entitled Annie Nightingale: Whatever Next?, broadcast between 8pm and 10pm. The show featured a variety of genres from the seven decades from the 1950s onwards.

50th Anniversary at Radio 1 and Radio 2

In 2020, Nightingale celebrated her 50th anniversary in broadcasting with a series of BBC specials, and a compilation album on Ministry of Sound. This features tracks by the Rolling Stones and Paul McCartney who have never before granted permission for their music to appear on compilations.

Annie's 50th anniversary at Radio 1 was marked by two documentaries on BBC TV and the release of her new memoir on 3 September 2020, published by White Rabbit Books, an imprint of Weidenfeld & Nicolson. The book looks at pop culture and social history over five decades, covering never before seen interviews with artists ranging from the Beatles to Billie Eilish, and includes Bob Marley, Marc Bolan, Primal Scream, the Streets, Dusty Springfield, Keith Moon, Elvis Costello, Little Simz and more. The memoir covers Annie's 50 years at Radio 1, having  been the first female DJ, she is now also the longest serving broadcaster on the station of any gender. The book also contains recollections of Paris in the 1950s, early raves in London, the Falklands War and the 1992 Los Angeles riots.

Personal life
Nightingale has been married twice: first to writer Gordon Thomas, with whom she had two children, Alex and Lucy; and then to actor Binky Baker since 1978, who appeared in Gangster No. 1 (2000).

References

External links

Annie Nightingale presents... (BBC Radio 1)
Annie Nightingale: Whatever Next?
Radio Academy Hall of Fame page
Annie Nightingale at Radio Rewind
National History Day Research Project on Annie Nightingale

1940 births
Living people
Alumni of the University of Westminster
BBC Radio 1 presenters
BBC Radio 2 presenters
BBC Radio 6 Music presenters
BBC television presenters
British women television presenters
British radio DJs
British radio presenters
British women radio presenters
British women columnists
Commanders of the Order of the British Empire
Daily Express people
Musicians from London
People educated at Lady Eleanor Holles School
People from Osterley